Good Hope is a small fishing farming community located on the east coast of Dominica.  The community is home to about 500 residents. The community is mainly managed by a Resource Centre Management Committee, which oversees projects of development, the functioning of the community's resource centre and also the overall well-being of the community.

Geography
Good Hope has one small and rocky beach.  A short distance from shore are two small rock outcroppings which can be climbed and played upon.  These are locally known as "Ti Loo" and "Gwo Loo".

Facilities
Within the community you can find a few local "shops", one disco, the aforementioned resource centre (which contains a pre-school, main hall, computer centre, library and kitchen) and local homes.  The village has had access to running water, electricity and cable television for about 10-15 years.  Most households have electricity and cable television.  Some households have running water.

Populated places in Dominica